James Lawrence "Bud" Walton (December 20, 1921 – March 21, 1995) was the brother of Sam Walton and co-founder of Walmart.

Biography

Early life
Walton was born to Thomas Gibson Walton and Nancy "Nannie" Lee Lawrence Walton on December 20, 1921, in Kingfisher, Oklahoma. His father worked as a farm appraiser and mortgage agent. The family moved often because of Thomas Walton's job. When he was 2 years old, his family moved from Oklahoma to Springfield, Missouri. The Walton family later lived in Marshall, Shelbina, and Columbia, Missouri.

Growing up in the Great Depression, Bud Walton and his older brother Sam learned the value of hard work. As children, the boys worked on the family's farm. Bud Walton delivered newspapers, worked as a lifeguard, and did yard work to help the family. He attended David H. Hickman High School in Columbia, Missouri. He played varsity basketball and was elected senior class president.

After graduation, he attended Wentworth Military Academy in Lexington, Missouri. He served as a Navy pilot in World War II. While undergoing flight training, Bud met and married his wife, Audrey. They had two daughters, Ann and Nancy.

Career
Bud and his brother, Sam, began their career in the retail industry working in the Ben Franklin Stores, a franchised unit of Butler Brothers of Chicago. His first store was opened in Versailles, Missouri. Bud and Sam co-founded Walmart in Arkansas in 1962.

Wal-Mart Stores Inc. opened its first Sam's Club – named for Sam Walton – on April 7, 1983, in Midwest City, Oklahoma.

Together, the Walton brothers donated $150,000 to build a new home for the Columbia Chamber of Commerce and Columbia Convention and Visitors Bureau in Columbia, Missouri. The building was named the Thomas G. Walton Building in honor of their father.

Bud Walton donated $15 million for the construction of a basketball arena at the University of Arkansas in Fayetteville. The arena is named Bud Walton Arena in his honor. College of the Ozarks in Point Lookout, Missouri, is home to the James L. "Bud" Walton Chair of Retailing. It was named in honor of Bud Walton's support of the school.

Death

Walton died following surgery for an aneurysm in Miami, Florida, on March 21, 1995, at the age of 73. He is buried in Memorial Park Cemetery in Columbia, Missouri.

See also
 Walton family

References

1921 births
1995 deaths
Burials at Memorial Park Cemetery (Columbia, Missouri)
Bud
Businesspeople from Columbia, Missouri
People from Bentonville, Arkansas
Wentworth Military Academy and College alumni
United States Navy pilots of World War II
University of Arkansas people
Hickman High School alumni
20th-century American businesspeople